Richard Eddy (4 August 1882 – 21 September 1955) was a New Zealand labourer and trade unionist. He was a member of the New Zealand Legislative Council from 23 June 1941 to 22 June 1948; then 23 June 1948 to 31 December 1950 when the Council was abolished. He was appointed by the First Labour Government

He was born in Doyleston, North Canterbury, New Zealand on 4 August 1882. He died aged 73 years.

References 

1882 births
1955 deaths
Members of the New Zealand Legislative Council
New Zealand Labour Party MLCs
New Zealand trade unionists
People from Doyleston